Canu may refer to:

 Fabien Canu (born 1960), French judoka
 Ferdinand Canu (1863–1932), French paleontologist and author
 Gabriel Cânu (born 1981), Romanian former footballer
 Stéphane Canu (born 1968), French former footballer
 Yvonne Canu (1921–2008), French painter